Betul Lok Sabha constituency is one of the 29 Lok Sabha constituencies in Madhya Pradesh state in central India. This constituency is reserved for the candidates belonging to the Scheduled Tribes. It covers the entire Betul and Harda districts and part of Khandwa district.

Assembly segments
Like most other Lok Sabha seats in MP and Chhattisgarh, with few seats like Durg (which has nine assembly segments under it) being exceptions, Betul Lok Sabha seat has 8 assembly seats as its segments. Presently, since the delimitation of the parliamentary and legislative assembly constituencies in 2008, Betul Lok Sabha constituency comprises the following eight Vidhan Sabha (Legislative Assembly) segments:

Members of Parliament

^ by poll

Election results

2019

2014

2009

See also
 Betul district
 List of Constituencies of the Lok Sabha

References

External links
Betul lok sabha  constituency election 2019 result details

Lok Sabha constituencies in Madhya Pradesh
Betul district
Harda district